Aquilaria hirta is a species of plant in the Thymelaeaceae family. It is found in Malaysia and Indonesia. Aquilaria hirta are suited for carving and hard like stone, but the species of Aquilaria hirta are seldom used in perfume and incense due to rarity.

References

hirta
Vulnerable plants
Taxonomy articles created by Polbot